Too Cool! Cartoons is a series of adult animated shorts on the YouTube channel Cartoon Hangover. It was created by Fred Seibert and produced by Frederator Studios. The series premiered on April 4, 2013, with the short Our New Electrical Morals. It was planned to feature 39 shorts but ended up releasing only 11 shorts.

Too Cool! Cartoons is Frederator's fifth cartoon "incubator" series over the past 21 years, featuring unique voices in short animated films, meant to introduce original characters and animation creators. The other series include What A Cartoon! (1995, with Hanna-Barbera and Cartoon Network), Oh Yeah! Cartoons (1995, with Nickelodeon), The Meth Minute 39 (2008, with Channel Frederator), and Random! Cartoons (2008, with Nickelodeon).

The series was available to view on VRV until Cartoon Hangover Select was removed from the site in December 2021.

Description
Too Cool! Cartoons showcases animated shorts. The series is Frederator's fifth cartoon incubator, in which animators have their work shown on Frederator's YouTube channel Cartoon Hangover.

Too Cool! Cartoons has been a multi-national effort, with creators and artists in England, Australia, Greece, South Korea, Scotland, Japan, Canada, Sweden, and the United States.

Reception

Laura Beck of Jezebel called Bee and PuppyCat "adorable and hilarious," and Meredith Woemer of io9 wrote, "This might be the first cartoon webseries we didn't want to end." The two-part short led to a Kickstarter campaign to raise funds for a full season; the campaign was successfully funded, raising $872,133 in November 2013 to go toward producing nine original new episodes of the series.

Robert Lloyd of the Los Angeles Times wrote that Manly was "psychedelic and melancholy," and Susana Polo of The Mary Sue called the short "weird and awesome."

Filmography 
Fred Seibert cartoon shorts filmography

References

2013 web series debuts
American adult animated web series
American adult animation anthology series
Frederator Studios
YouTube original programming
Webtoons